Ethel Larcombe  (née Ethel Warneford Thomson, 8 June 1879 – 11 August 1965) was a British female tennis player and badminton player. She won the ladies' singles tennis title at the 1912 Wimbledon Championships as well as 11 badminton titles at the All England Badminton Championships.

Career
Ethel was born 8 June 1879 as the second child of Herbert Warneford Thomson, surgeon, and his wife, Sophia Charlotte Bond. Her older brother Hugh was born in 1878.

She first competed at Wimbledon in 1902 when she lost in the first round to Agnes Morton. The following year, 1903, she reached the final of the All-Comers tournament in which she was defeated by Dorothea Douglass in three sets. Larcombe did not play competitive tennis for four years from 1907 until her return in 1911. In 1912 she became Wimbledon champion by first defeating Charlotte Cooper Sterry in the All-Comers' final and subsequently receiving a walkover in the Challenge Round. The following year she was unable to defend her singles title when she was injured in the final of the mixed doubles. Her partner James Cecil Parke misjudged a smash in the second set which hit her full on the side of the face and the resulting eye injury forced her to retire from the mixed doubles final and to default from her challenge round match against Dorothea Lambert Chambers scheduled for the following day. In total she participated in 11 editions of the Wimbledon Championships between 1902 and 1921.

She won the Scottish Championships singles title three times (1910–12) and she won the singles title at the Irish Championships in 1912 defeating Mrs. Norton-Barry in the final in two sets.

Playing style
In contrast to most of her contemporaries Larcombe played her service underhand. In 1903 A. Wallis Myers wrote that her favorite shot was the backhand down the line and that she possessed an effective smash. According to Dorothea Lambert-Chambers she was one of the best female volleyers of her time but did not have a very good condition, causing her to fade in matches. After her return to tennis in 1911 several aspects of her game had improved including her forehand shot as well as her stamina.

Grand Slam finals

Singles (1 title, 2 runners-up)

Doubles (3 runner-ups)

Mixed doubles (1 title, 1 runner-up) 

1 This was the all-comers final as Dorothea Douglass Lambert Chambers did not defend her 1911 Wimbledon title, which resulted in the winner of the all-comers final winning the challenge round and, thus, Wimbledon in 1912 by walkover.
2 This was the all-comers final as Muriel Robb did not defend her 1902 Wimbledon title, which resulted in the winner of the all-comers final winning the challenge round and, thus, Wimbledon in 1903 by walkover.

Badminton
As a badminton player she won 11 titles at the All England Badminton Championships, five of them in women's singles (1900, 1901, 1903, 1904 and 1906), four in women's doubles and two in mixed doubles.

Personal life
On 15 October 1906 she married Major Dudley Larcombe, who was secretary of the All England Club from 1925 to 1939.

References

1879 births
1965 deaths
English female tennis players
English female badminton players
People from Islington (district)
Wimbledon champions (pre-Open Era)
Grand Slam (tennis) champions in women's singles
Grand Slam (tennis) champions in mixed doubles
Tennis people from Greater London
British female tennis players